David Blacha (born 22 October 1990) is a professional footballer who plays as a midfielder for SV Meppen. Born in Germany, he has represented Poland at youth level.

Club career
Born in Wickede, Blacha played for FC 09 Fröndenberg and Borussia Dortmund as a youth. In July 2009, he signed a one-year contract with Rot Weiss Ahlen in the 2. Bundesliga. He made his league debut on 23 August, coming on a substitute for Christian Mikolajczak in the 66th minute against Rot-Weiß Oberhausen. Despite relegation, he signed an extension for the following season. After Ahlen was relegated again in 2011, Blacha signed a two-year contract with fellow 3. Liga side SV Sandhausen.

In January 2015, he left cash-strapped Hansa Rostock and joined promotion aspirant SV Wehen Wiesbaden signing  a two and a half years contract until 2017. Despite being on a relegation spot Hansa Rostock had to sell him alike top talent Max Christiansen to fulfill conditions for retaining their 3. Liga license.

International career
Blacha was a part of the Poland U19 national team.

References

External links
 

1990 births
Living people
People from Soest (district)
Sportspeople from Arnsberg (region)
German people of Polish descent
Citizens of Poland through descent
Association football midfielders
Polish footballers
Poland youth international footballers
German footballers
Rot Weiss Ahlen players
SV Sandhausen players
FC Hansa Rostock players
SV Wehen Wiesbaden players
VfL Osnabrück players
SV Meppen players
2. Bundesliga players
3. Liga players
Footballers from North Rhine-Westphalia